Dynamo: Magician Impossible is a fly on the wall documentary series following the life of English magician Steven Frayne, better known as Dynamo. The show is produced by Phil McIntyre Productions and Inner Circle Films for UKTV's channel Watch and Universal Networks International. In 2012, the show was nominated for Best Entertainment Programme at the 17th National Television Awards.

Four series of Dynamo: Magician Impossible were commissioned and broadcast on Watch between 2011 and 2014. The series reached over 30 million viewers in the UK and over 250 million viewers worldwide across 193 territories. After being broadcast on Watch, it was confirmed on 19 December 2013 that three episodes from the show's first series would air on BBC One the following year. Repeats are now regularly broadcast on UKTV's channel Dave.

Background 
In 2003, before Frayne created and filmed Dynamo: Magician Impossible, the Prince's Trust gave him a loan which allowed him to start his business and invest in camera equipment. Frayne left his hometown of Bradford, Yorkshire, to move to London in 2004 to begin developing his career in magic. His plan was to create the first ever 'magic mix-tape', where he set out with a small team to film his performances on the streets of London and backstage at events. In a year, Frayne had performed magic to talent including Coldplay, Gwyneth Paltrow, Snoop Dogg and more, and quickly developed a fan-base after posting the clips on YouTube.

Frayne first appeared on TV as Dynamo on Channel 4’s Richard & Judy, where the general public and television executives quickly noticed his kind-hearted and loveable attitude.

Series overview

Series 1 
The four-episode first series aired from 7 July 2011 until 28 July 2011. To launch the show, Frayne walked on water across the River Thames outside the Houses of Parliament, in front of a crowd who had gathered on Westminster Bridge. The first series was filmed in London, Miami and Los Angeles, and racked up 6.69 million viewers in the UK, leading to UKTV renewing the show for a second and third series in February 2012.

Series 2
Series 2 of Dynamo: Magician Impossible premiered on 5 July 2012, and was again four-episodes in duration. Episode 2 of this series saw Dynamo visit Rio de Janeiro, where he appeared to levitate in front of the Christ the Redeemer statue.

The series generated 7.67 million viewers in the UK and won the award for Best Entertainment Programme at the Broadcast Awards, show of the year at the Virgin Media awards and was shortlisted for Best Entertainment Programme at the 17th National Television Awards. This series also received a BAFTA nomination for Best Entertainment Programme.

Series 3
In 2013, Frayne travelled to New York City, Ibiza, South Africa and London to film content for the show's third series. The first episode, filmed in New York City, was broadcast on 11 July 2013 and was viewed by 1.35 million people. The series was again nominated for BAFTA's Best Entertainment Programme award, alongside Ant & Dec's Saturday Night Takeaway, Derren Brown: The Great Art Robbery and Strictly Come Dancing.

Series 4
A fourth and final series of the show was commissioned by UKTV in 2014, which aired in the September of the same year. In this series, Dynamo performed street magic in California, India, Paris, London, Manchester and Bradford. For the third year running, Dynamo: Magician Impossible was nominated by BAFTA for the Best Entertainment Programme award.

International syndications

References

External links
 Official website

2011 British television series debuts
2014 British television series endings
British television documentaries
British television magic series
English-language television shows
UKTV original programming